Besenzone is a comune (municipality) in the Province of Piacenza in the Italian region Emilia-Romagna, located about  northwest of Bologna and about  southeast of Piacenza.

Besenzone borders the following municipalities: Alseno, Busseto, Cortemaggiore, Fiorenzuola d'Arda, Villanova sull'Arda.

References

Cities and towns in Emilia-Romagna